The history of gangs in Australia goes back to the colonial era. Criminal gangs flourished in The Rocks district of Sydney in its early history in the 19th century. The Rocks Push was a notorious larrikin gang which dominated the area from the 1800s to the end of the 1900s. The gang was engaged in running warfare with other larrikin gangs of the time such as the Straw Hat Push, the Glebe Push, the Argyle Cut Push, the Forty Thieves from Surry Hills, and the Gibb Street Mob.

In the 20th century Italian crime gangs were active in Melbourne and Sydney, and youth gangs like the Sharpies in the 1960s have been large enough to cause disturbances, though lacking criminal organisation.

So-called "outlaw" bikie gangs have had a very visible presence in many places throughout Australia since the 1950s, and several laws have been specifically prompted by their actions.

Gang types

Southeast Asian and Chinese gangs 

In the late 1980s, the Vietnamese gang 5T was active in the Cabramatta area of Sydney and were believed to be involved in the murder of John Newman, the Member for Cabramatta in the NSW State Parliament. Newman had been the target of numerous death threats from Asian gangs but did not seek police protection. During the night of 5 September 1994 while outside his Woods Avenue home, he was shot twice and killed.  His fiancée, Lucy Wang, was with him at the time but saw little of what happened because of the swiftness of the murder.

Other gangs active in Cabramatta, Sydney include, T.A.I, 108,  the Four Aces and Madonna's Mob. Chinese gangs have existed as a low level activity for at least 20 years.

Whilst media focus on Asian gangs in Australia is not as severe as it once was in the 1980s, activities across a diverse criminal portfolio continue to occur. Groups at varied states of organisation are involved in murder, violence, drug importation and distribution, money laundering, human trafficking, and coercion of women into illegal prostitution.

In terms of Chinese gang activity, highly organised crime syndicates in Sydney have looked to Chinese youths on student visas for their recruitment drives. Multimillion-dollar prostitution rackets have been operating in Melbourne for several years, one of the largest by Mulgrave woman Xue Di Yan.

For over two decades there has been concern expressed about the increase of organised criminal activity by Vietnamese in Australia, with media attention focusing specifically on 'crime gangs'. For example, a 1988 media report stated: 'Criminal gangs in the Vietnamese community are increasingly heavily armed, are moving into drugs and gambling, establishing links with Australian crime figures, and becoming involved in standover rackets in their own community'.

Vietnamese criminal groups have been involved in distributing heroin in Australia. It has become apparent that a number of these Vietnamese groups are organising heroin shipments, either independently of or in association with established Chinese heroin trafficking operations. An increasing amount of heroin coming to Australia appears to have been transhipped through Vietnam. A gang called '5T', based in the Sydney suburb of Cabramatta, has become prominent in the distribution of very pure heroin in the district, as well as systematic extortion, home invasion robberies and other offences.

Vietnamese criminal groups appear to be involved in all levels of the heroin trade from street dealing to importing. They are also willing to purchase from Chinese importers and to wholesale to other groups, such as Romanian and Lebanese dealers. The heroin the Vietnamese import themselves is believed to come via Vietnam, which is apparently experiencing both increased production of opium increased transit of heroin.

Western Australia's Deputy Police Commissioner, Mr Les Ayton, said. 'There is good intelligence and anecdotal evidence that the Vietnamese (criminals) are now emerging as major importers of heroin'. A media report in April 1994 cited Queensland police sources as believing that millions of dollars of heroin had been sent from Ho Chi Minh City to Queensland during the earlier part of 1994

The Australian Bureau of Criminal Intelligence (ABCI) has given the following description of the drug trafficking network in the Sydney suburb of Cabramatta involving the 5T gang.

5T was engaged in "securing a large market with Cabramatta as its centre, by supplying high-quality Southeast Asian heroin (from 65 to 75% pure) for the same price that lower purity heroin was sold for elsewhere (a cap of 0.03 gm cost $40–50 on the street). This attracted addicts and dealers from far and wide. By organising its own importations of heroin (typically impregnated in fabric, or carried by couriers returning from Vietnam), it was able to greatly reduce its reliance (and its overheads) on the Chinese criminals who supply the greater proportion of the market. The 5T gang also cut out the middlemen, and sold directly to the street. A marked increase was noted in heroin overdoses, prompting the New South Wales Health Department to issue a public warning.

Middle Eastern gangs 

For a long time, Middle-Eastern gangs organization conducted extortion against nightclubs, ram raids, and car theft. More recently, drive-by shootings have become more common, with tit for tat drive by shooting starting as early as 1998, and becoming more common in recent years, including a drive by machine gun attack on a police station in Lakemba, Sydney.

In 2006, a permanent Middle-Eastern Organised Crime squad was set up following revenge attacks, including stabbings and assaults, by Middle Eastern youths following the Cronulla riots.

Outlaw motorcycle gangs 

Outlaw motorcycle gangs are present in Australia, with international outlaw clubs like the Bandidos and Hells Angels and Gypsy Jokers as well as local groups. One of the major events in Australian motorcycle gang criminal history was what became known as the Milperra Massacre in 1984, where a fight between two gangs, the Comancheros and the Bandidos in Milperra in the South of Sydney, turned into a gun battle that claimed seven lives - six gang members and an uninvolved bystander. While conflict between various clubs has been ever present, in 2008 the gang conflict escalated, with 13 shootings taking place in Sydney in the space of two weeks.

Gang violence has become high-profile to the point where various state governments have taken steps to change laws to focus on the problem, and police have set up groups to deal with the threat, including the Crime Gang Task Force in South Australia Bikie gangs in South Australia at least, are involved in drugs, murder, extortion and other forms of intimidation and violence. Bikie gangs in South Australia have diversified their activities into both legal and illegal commercial business enterprises.

In Western Australia they are involved in the drug trade. Laws to deal with Bikie gangs (applying to any association, bike or otherwise) have been introduced into Northern Territory, South Australia, and are presently being looked at in NSW and Queensland.

In early 2009, Comanchero Motorcycle Club and Hells Angels were involved in a clash at Sydney Airport. One Hell's Angels associate member was beaten to death in plain view of witnesses at the airport, and police estimated as many as 15 men were involved in the violence. Police documents detail the brawl as a result of the Comanchero and Hells Angels Presidents being on the same flight from Melbourne. Four suspects were arrested as a result of the altercation. The head of the Comancheros was initially sentenced to 21 years jail for the murder after a nine-month trial, but in May 2014 he was granted a retrial. 4 years later on 14 February 2018, the now 'ex' Comanchero boss was gunned down out the front of a gym in Sydney in a possible retaliation attack.

Including two murders in the capital city, 4 people were killed in the space of a week in Canberra and in Sydney. As a result of heightening violence, New South Wales Premier Nathan Rees announced the state police anti-gang squad would be boosted to 125 members from 50.

A growing percentage of the crime attributed to outlaw motorcycle gangs since around 2010 has not been committed by known bikie members. Much of the crime has been committed by non-riding members or associates of these gangs, that way the core members of the bikie gangs can be more easily protected from the more aggressive police tactics and the tougher laws. Australia's bikie gangs continue to increase their campaign to completely corner the illicit drug trade in every state and territory.

In 2010, Derek Wainohu of the Hells Angels Motorcycle Club successfully obtained a declaration from the High Court that the Crimes (Criminal Organisations Control) Act 2009 (NSW), which empowered the Supreme Court to make control orders against individual members of organisations and prevented them from associating with one another, was invalid. The High Court held, by majority, that the Act was invalid on the basis that s 13(2) placed no obligation on the eligible judge making the control order to provide reasons when making a declaration of a control order. As such, the section contravened the institutional integrity of the Supreme Court. On construction, it was held that the validity of the whole Act relied on the validity of Part 2, which contained s 13(2), and therefore the whole Act was held invalid. The state of New South Wales was ordered to pay Wainohu's costs.

In 2013, Queensland enacted Criminal Law (Criminal Organisations Disruption) Amendment Act 2013 to criminalise outlaw motorcycle gangs.

Examples 

Motorcycle gangs in Australia include:

 Bandidos - One of the "Big Four" American gangs identified by authorities. They have 45 chapters across Australia and between 250 and 400 members. One of the clubs that has actively recruited from ethnic groups in recent years.
 Coffin Cheaters - They have chapters in Western Australia, Victoria, New South Wales and Queensland, as well as in Norway. They have between 200 and 300 members.
 Comanchero - One of the oldest outlaw clubs in Australia founded by Jock Ross during the late 60s early 70s. Its headquarters are in Western Sydney. It has chapters in Western Australia, Victoria and South Australia. They have between 250 and 300 members in Australia and have expanded in Spain and Serbia.
 Outcasts - a West Australian gang that has migrated east to Sydney and Brisbane. The confidentiality has kept names under the radar except for its founder and ex-leader FEZ who is unknown.
 DLASTHR - An Assyrian gang formed by Raymon Youmaran (who is now jailed for murder) in 2002, in the western suburbs of Sydney. The gang has been on the police radar since the mid-2000s. 
 Finks - Formed in Adelaide, South Australia, in 1969 and now has chapters in other states. It was reported in October 2013 that most members were to switch to the United States-based Mongols.
 Black Bandits - A youth gang founded in Marsden, Queensland in 2015 and now active across all over Queensland. Consisting of over 400 members, they are notoriously known for burglary and armed robberies.
 Gypsy Joker - The Gypsy Joker MC formed in the US in the late 60's and later amalgamated with South Australia's pre-eminent bad-boys club, Mandamas MC and later joined with the American-formed club, are most notorious for the 2001 car-bomb murders of West Australian police senior investigator Don Hancock and Lawrence Lewis. They have between 200 and 300 members in Australia.
 Hells Angels - Founded in the US and one of the "Big Four" American gangs, now active worldwide. In Australia, they have 150-250 members. The Angels have a Nomad Chapter which has caused friction with the Nomads MC.
 Nomads - The Nomads club has no website and is not as widely known as other clubs, but does have a significant presence in the press as an outlaw motorcycle club engaged in allegedly illegal activities.
 Notorious - The club Notorious, a Middle Eastern gang, started competing with Australian bikie gangs, in a turf war for drug sales. Notorious was reportedly using members of the Middle Eastern and Islander communities in Sydney. As of March 2012 the gang no longer exists as an organised structure after being dismantled by a police operation arresting key members and with other members choosing to quit the gang life.
 Rebels - The Rebels are the largest outlaw motorcycle club in Australia, and have 29 chapters. They are a more traditional club and are run by former boxer and founding member, Alex Vella. They are by far the largest club in Australia with around 2,000 members.

Youth gangs 
In contemporary Australia, "youth gangs" are perceived to be an increasing problem, but this notion has been claimed to be not founded upon any extended body of empirical evidence and does not identify to whom the alleged gangs are a problem. Nevertheless, the public perception of the 'street gang' is generally quite the opposite, as it is based upon media generated gang stereotypes that allegedly engage in any new horror.

During 1993–4, moral panic about 'Asian gangs' developed in NSW, after the murder of anti-drug campaigner and Member of Parliament, John Newman, in Cabramatta. Chris Cunneen's investigation into the stereotyping of ethnic gangs revealed that during the same period, not only Asian, but Lebanese and Pacific Islander youths were subjected to unnecessary discrimination by police. In July 1994, the Youth Justice Coalition of NSW reported that young people who were recognisably non-Anglo-Australian, especially those who identified themselves as Asian, Aboriginal or Pacific Islander, were being vigorously searched and arrested by police to a point of harassment.

In November 1994, a series of Daily Telegraph Mirror stories generated sufficient public concern about alleged crime levels in Sydney that it gave NSW Labor Party leader, Bob Carr, the opportunity to mount a political campaign based on gang violence. Three days later, NSW Premier, John Fahey, introduced the Children (Parental Responsibility) Bill 1994 which made parents criminally liable for the offences of their children and gave police the power to detain "at risk" or offending children for a period of 24 hours. In October 1998, another Sydney based moral panic over ethnic gangs was precipitated by the stabbing death of a fourteen year old schoolboy, Edward Lee. The police and the media "fed off each other" linking the crime to ethnicity . The media dutifully circulated police descriptions of racial phenotypes which clearly linked Lebanese males to crime and gangs, while the major NSW political parties took the opportunity to focus upon the forthcoming state election and to begin to out-bid each other on law and order issues.

An alternate opinion is that youth gangs have flourished throughout many of the large cities of Australia, especially Melbourne and Sydney. There are many suburban gangs throughout Melbourne involving clashes between North-West and North-East. As well as ongoing battles in Sydney's and Melbourne's Western suburbs, as well as Melbourne's south-eastern suburbs. There are many other gangs evolving throughout the outer suburbs of Brisbane and the inner Gold Coast. There have been increasing cases of Australian gangs notably Allied brotherz, Menace To Society and The Brotherhood and those claiming the name of American street gangs notably Black P Stones, Black Disciples, Latin Kings, MS-13, Bloods and Crips. There have also been cases of radical gangs such as Friends Stand United, Public Enemy No. 1, Volksfront and Blood & Honour in Australia. The internet has become a focal point for these gangs, posting pictures, post codes and sometimes even running a gang's personal website. Australian youth gangs grow in accordance to general population growth.

Unsubstantiated speculation persists that an increased level of youth violence has attributed to increased incarceration numbers in Queensland's South East. Gangs such as Butch Lesbian Soldiers (BLS), Village People and FLC have drawn comparisons to infamous gang cultures in areas such as Los Angeles and Moscow. However, Police Commissioner Bob Atkinson denies these suggestions of strong gang presence, saying, "Brisbane does not have crime gangs similar to Los Angeles ... There are groups of mainly young males who band together and become involved in criminal behaviour, but they are quite different from the criminal gangs that operate in the US." Commissioner Atkinson further stated the unfairness to attribute the increasing levels of youth violence and illegal activities with ethnically or culturally based gangs. In 2006, three youths were charged with assault following the attack (reported to be gang motivated) on two other youths from a neighbouring school.

Anti-gang legislation
There have been numerous laws passed which aim to specifically "crack down on gangs", in some way - but these have often been successfully challenged in the courts.

Some examples include:

 Serious and Organised Crime (Control) Act 2008, South Australia
 Serious Crime Control Act 2009, Northern Territory
 Crimes (Criminal Organisations Control) Act, 2009, NSW
 Crimes (Criminal Organisations Control) Act 2012, NSW
 Criminal Organisations Control Act 2012, Western Australia
 Vicious Lawless Association Disestablishment Act 2013, 2013, Queensland
 Criminal Law (Criminal Organisations Disruption) Amendment Act 2013, Queensland
 Serious and Organised Crime Amendment Bill, Queensland, 2016

A review tabled in the NSW Parliament in 2017 concludes that such laws: "...have been ineffective and police anti-gang squads have stopped using them".

See also 
 Organised crime in Australia

References

Further information 
 "History of Gangs in Australia". ABC, Late night live. http://www.abc.net.au/rn/latenightlive/stories/2008/2288288.htm
 Silvest, John "Outlaw gangs make killing" The Age, 24 September 2006. http://www.theage.com.au/news/national/outlaw-gangs-make-killing/2006/09/23/1158431948594.html
 Priest, Tim "The rise of Middle Eastern Crime in Australia" https://web.archive.org/web/20120717033909/http://www.australian-news.com.au/The%20rise%20of%20Middle%20Eastern%20crime%20in%20Australia.pdf
 Buttler, Mark "Neighbours fear gang violence will spiral into gun battles as secret police report exposes fears of open warfare" http://www.heraldsun.com.au/news/secret-police-report-exposes-gang-fears-as-open-warfare-erupts/story-e6frf7jo-1225868879397